Chitora is the name of multiple villages in India. These include: 

Chitora in Khatauli block, Muzaffarnagar district, Uttar Pradesh
Chitora in Rajapur block, Ghaziabad district, Uttar Pradesh
Chitora, Gohad tehsil, Bhind district, Madhya Pradesh